Josephine M. "Jo" Culbertson (née Murphy; 2 February 1898 – March 23, 1956) was an American bridge player, teacher, theorist and writer.

Josephine Murphy was born in Bayside, New York (now in Queens), to parents John Edward Murphy and Sarah McCarthy Murphy. She worked as secretary to the auction bridge authority Wilbur C. Whitehead in the early 1920s and married Ely Culbertson in 1923 (divorced 1938). The Culbertsons developed and taught the Approach–Forcing system of bidding at auction and later at contract bridge, and founded The Bridge World magazine in 1929. 

Some time later her name was Josephine Murphy Dillon.

Culbertson was inducted into the ACBL Hall of Fame in 1996.

Bridge accomplishments

Honors

 ACBL Hall of Fame, 1996

Wins
 North American Bridge Championships (2)
 Vanderbilt (1) 1930 
 Spingold (1) 1930

Runners-up

 North American Bridge Championships
 von Zedtwitz Life Master Pairs (1) 1930 
 Whitehead Women's Pairs (1) 1930 
 Fall National Open Pairs (1) 1928 
 Spingold (1) 1934 
 Reisinger (1) 1935

References

External links
 

 Women Stars at the World Bridge Federation – with biographies (Culbertson)
 WorldCat search: Culbertson, Josephine 

1898 births
1956 deaths
American contract bridge players
Contract bridge writers
Writers from New York City